Wolfgang Buchleitner (known as "Wolf" Buchleitner, born Wolfgang Schwarz) (born 25 June 1954; died July 2016) was a multifaceted German artist, equipment designer and inventor. Buchleitner was the head and catalyst of the Quantec ProAudio enterprise.

Personal life
Buchleitner was born in Stuttgart, Baden-Württemberg, Germany and spent his childhood in Bad Wildbad in the secluded northern Black Forest. This played a certain role in his development, because in a place with hardly any neighborhood kids to play with, you have to find some other way to occupy yourself with. He attended the Gymnasium in Neuenbürg and the Goetheschule Freie Waldorfschule in Pforzheim.

He was married to Almuth Buchleitner and has a son, Frederik. He lived in Munich, Bavaria.

Professional career
Buchleitner developed his own digital reverb algorithm. Without any college education, he surprised the audio community in 1982 with the Quantec QRS "Room Simulator", a digital reverberator he designed and built by himself, considered to be among the all time favorites in this field and a legend for years. Units were still produced as late as 1995. Its fame and reputation remain undiminished after 25 years. The original QRS units, as well as the later "Yardsticks", are still popular among sound engineers, especially in broadcast and audio/film production. 

In 1982 he founded the Quantec ProAudio enterprise with headquarters in Munich.

Since 1992, he has been working on the planning of the Quancor device series, which ensure that all digital devices in a broadcasting or recording studio are perfectly synchronized with each other for reliable interoperation. During this time, two patents have been registered on this subject.

The successful, but slightly bulky and electronically complex design of the QRS was cast into a more modern DSP platform with the "Yardstick" that came out in 1997. It had the original room simulation algorithm embedded into a hardware design with considerably more processing power.

In 2008, the critically acclaimed "Room Simulator" algorithm was again improved with a completely redesigned Quantec Yardstick series for stereo and surround sound, with a comprehensive feature set.

Music
Buchleitner played piano since the age of 6 and at age 14 he joined his first rock band – as a keyboard player. He was also member of the German folk rock band Scheytholtz. He also took part in numerous multimedia projects, among all together with Dietrich Lohff and Dieter Mack.

Quantec equipment is used several hundred times throughout the world by radio and TV broadcasters, recording, dubbing and film studios, music venues and theatres as well as many famous rock and pop musicians of international standing.

Reference Links
International Homepage Quantec Tontechnik

1954 births
2016 deaths
20th-century German musicians
20th-century German inventors
Musicians from Stuttgart
German keyboardists